Under the Southern Cross also known as The Devil's Pit or Taranga, is a 1929 American drama film set in New Zealand, directed by Lew Collins for Universal Studios, who also wrote the screenplay. Originally titled Taranga by the original director Alexander Markey, but was completed by Collins and released as Under the Southern Cross in 1929, then with the introduction of sound was given a soundtrack and retitled The Devil’s Pit in 1930. The film was shot on White Island, which has an active volcano.

It is one of four films (with Down on the Farm, Hei Tiki and On the Friendly Road) which lay claim to be the first "New Zealand talkie", although dubious as the sound was added to the 1930 release in the United States.

Only fragments of out-takes are left. The film probably has no connection with the 1927 British film of the same name, directed by Gustav Pauli.

Plot
In pre-European New Zealand there are two hostile Māori tribes. The chief of one tribe proposes to marry his daughter Miro into the other tribe, the Waiti. But a contest, The Challenge of the Spear, must be held, with the victor to marry Miro. Rangi, a vicious warrior wins by trickery. Miro is by tapu forbidden from seeing her true love Patiti. But Patiti rows across the lake to see her nightly, until the suspicious Rangi finds them. In a deadly struggle on the edge of the volcano, Patiti forces Rangi into the volcano. War resumes, but love brings a compromise and Miro and Patiti marry.

Cast
Patiti Warbrick as Patiti
Witarina Mitchell as Miro

References

New Zealand Film 1912-1996 by Helen Martin & Sam Edwards p42 (1997, Oxford University Press, Auckland)

External links
 
 Still picture possibly taken during filming (although taken at Whakarewarewa, not White Island)

1929 films
Universal Pictures films
New Zealand drama films
Lost New Zealand films
Films set in New Zealand
1920s English-language films
1929 drama films
Films shot in New Zealand
Films directed by Lewis D. Collins
1929 lost films
Lost drama films
American drama films
Lost American films
1920s American films